Sagħtar is a Maltese magazine published by the Malta Union of Teachers. It is published monthly during the school year, and is intended mainly for use within Maltese primary and secondary schools. Its content ranges from information regarding current local and international topics, to Maltese literature. In Maltese sagħtar refers to wild thyme, and also to the striated pardalote.

Overview
Sagħtar was first published in 1971, having been started by the "Moviment Qawmien Letterarju". In 1976, it was handed to the Malta Union of Teachers (MUT). The final issue of the printed Sagħtar was published in December 2015, and the printed version of the magazine was discontinued due to high printing costs. The MUT planned to decide on the future of the magazine  and restarted issuing it as an online version as from October 2020.

Many Maltese schools use Sagħtar as part of a Maltese lesson. Indeed, it is used both to encourage students to read Maltese, and to teach students about certain topics which may be featured in that particular edition.

References

1971 establishments in Malta
2015 disestablishments in Malta
Education magazines
Magazines established in 1971
Magazines disestablished in 2015
Magazines published in Malta
Monthly magazines